Red Clay is a 1970 album by Freddie Hubbard.

Red Clay may also refer to:
 Red Clay (film), a 1927 American silent film, starring William Desmond
 Red Clay Consolidated School District, a public school district in northern New Castle County, Delaware
 Red Clay Creek, a tributary of White Clay Creek
 Red Clay State Park, an interpretive center along the Trail of Tears

See also
Red clay (disambiguation)